Symphony of a City is a 1947 Swedish documentary short film about Stockholm, directed by Arne Sucksdorff. It won an Oscar in 1949 for Best Short Subject (One-Reel).

References

External links
 

1947 films
1947 documentary films
1947 short films
Black-and-white documentary films
Swedish black-and-white films
Documentary films about cities
Films directed by Arne Sucksdorff
Live Action Short Film Academy Award winners
1940s short documentary films
1940s Swedish-language films
Swedish short documentary films
Films set in Stockholm
Culture in Stockholm
1940s Swedish films